"Fire" is a song recorded by American recording artist Michelle Williams. It serves as the second single from her fourth album Journey to Freedom.

Critical reception
"Fire" received positive reviews from critics. Mike Wass of Idolator said "the slick club-banger pulses with staccato beats and intricate hooks — all while Michelle stays true to her faith on the catchy chorus: 'it feels just like fire, fire caught up in my bones, don't leave me alone'!" Wass also noted that "'Fire' could well be the first ode to Jesus that inspires listeners to drop it low since Mary Mary's 'Shackles (Praise You)'. Which is quite the feat." Timothy Yap of Hallels called the song "a creative art in itself. Weaving in some seed thoughts from 1 Peter, the Hebrew narrative of Daniel's friends in the furnace, and her own autobiography, 'Fire' is a 'must-hear.'"

Track listing

References

2012 songs
2013 singles
Michelle Williams (singer) songs
Songs written by Harmony Samuels
Song recordings produced by Harmony Samuels
MNRK Music Group singles
Songs written by Courtney Harrell